Greek Orthodox Church of the Assumption is a historic church at 9th and Castro Streets in Oakland, California.

It was built in a Beaux Arts style and was added to the National Register in 1978.

References

Eastern Orthodox churches in California
Churches in Oakland, California
European-American culture in Oakland, California
Greek-American culture in California
National Register of Historic Places in Oakland, California
Churches on the National Register of Historic Places in California
Churches completed in 1920
Church buildings with domes
Beaux-Arts architecture in California